Amos Lugoloobi (born 21 June 1961) is a Ugandan politician. He is currently the state minister for finance and planning and the representative member for Ntenjeru north, Kayunga District in the Ugandan 11th Parliament.

Background and education 
Lugoloobi  was to Bwogi (father) former UTV director and Mary Bwogi (mother) in Kayunga District. He holds a bachelors degree in economics from Makerere University and a master's degree in Business Administration from the Eastern and Southern Africa Management Institute (ESAMI).

Career 
He is a politician and he is affiliated to National Resistance Movement and a member of parliament. He runs personal projects relating to clean water, games and sports, health, education, student sponsorship programs and livelihood enhancement initiatives such as bore hall drilling and repair.

Personal details 
Lugoloobi is married to Evelyne Nakimera.

Parliamentary duties 
He is an active member of the business committee, committee of finance, planning and economic development and the budgets committee. He is currently the state minister for finance.

See also 
 List of members of the eleventh Parliament of Uganda

External links 

 Website of the Parliament of Uganda
 Kayunga District Local Government Website

References 

1961 births
Living people
Makerere University alumni
Eastern and Southern African Management Institute alumni
Members of the Parliament of Uganda
National Resistance Movement politicians